The Volkswagen Phaeton (Typ 3D) is a full-size luxury sedan/saloon manufactured by the German automobile manufacturer Volkswagen, described by Volkswagen as their "premium class" vehicle. Introduced at the 2002 Geneva Motor Show, the Phaeton was marketed worldwide. Sales in North America ended in 2006 and global sales ended in 2016.

The name Phaeton derives from Phaëton, the son of Phoebus (or Helios) in Greek mythology, by way of the phaeton auto body style and the type of horse-drawn carriage that preceded it.

Production ended in March 2016 and an all-electric second generation was slated to be produced. Starting in April 2017, the Gläserne Manufaktur Dresden assembles the e-Golf instead.

First and second series (2002) (GP0/GP1)

Development
The Phaeton was conceived by Ferdinand Piëch, then chairman of Volkswagen Group, who wanted a car that would surpass the German prestige market leaders, Mercedes-Benz and BMW, in part as a response to Mercedes' and BMW's decision to compete in Europe directly with Volkswagen by introducing the A-Class and BMW 3 Series Compact.

The Phaeton was also intended to support the Volkswagen brand image. Although the Volkswagen Group already had a direct competitor in the full sized luxury segment, the Audi A8, the Phaeton was intended to be more of a comfort-oriented limousine, like the Mercedes-Benz S-Class and Lexus LS, where the Audi A8 and BMW 7 Series are more sport-oriented.

Initial development of the Phaeton, given the internal project code VW611, began with Piëch giving his engineers a list of ten parameters the car needed to fulfill. Most of these specifications were not made known to the public, but a number of them were told to automotive reporters.

Another requirement was that the car should have a torsional rigidity of 37,000 N·m/degree.

At the 1999 International Motor Show Germany, Volkswagen presented the Concept D, which was essentially a hatchback prototype of the Phaeton, with very similar design, V10 TDI engine, air suspension and all wheel drive.

Overview
The Phaeton's platform, the Volkswagen Group D1 platform, was shared with the Bentley Continental GT and Bentley Flying Spur. Certain systems, such as the automatic transmission and some engines, are also shared with the Audi A8.

Compared to the Audi A8L 4.2 litre FSI quattro, the Phaeton is  heavier but is still competitive with the lighter A8 in most driving tests, due to the Phaeton's increased engine power (335 hp versus 330) and a shorter axle ratio (3.65:1 versus 3.32). However, the weight gives the Phaeton considerably worse acceleration and poorer fuel economy compared to the A8.

The Phaeton had the longest wheelbase in the Volkswagen passenger car line.

Features
Development of the vehicle led to over one hundred individual patents specific to the Phaeton. Distinctive features include a draftless four zone climate system, and standard Torsen based 4motion four-wheel drive.

For high ride comfort, it introduced Adaptive Air Suspension with Continuous Damping Control (CDC)-(Skyhook suspension). The same suspension system, with firmer settings, was introduced in the technically similar Audi A8 in November 2002.

First Volkswagen with radar adaptive cruise control: automatic distance regulator (ADR).

Phaeton Lounge (2005)
The Phaeton Lounge was a concept car based on a lengthened version of the Phaeton with seating for four (two pairs of seats facing each other) in the rear compartment. It features a W12 engine, a reinforced chassis, six speed Tiptronic automatic transmission, individual climate control for each passenger, front and rear wine coolers, a minibar, multi color mood lighting, a cigar humidor, two 17 inch monitors, DVD changer in the trunk, second DVD player in the rear cabin, and a Bluetooth enabled computer with a broadband connection.

The vehicle was unveiled in 2005 Middle East International Motor Show.

Production
The Phaeton was hand assembled in an eco friendly factory with a glass exterior, the Transparent Factory in Dresden, Germany. This factory had a capacity of producing 20,000 vehicles a year, and was planned to expand to 35,000 vehicles a year. It also assembled Bentley Flying Spur vehicles destined for the European market until October 2006, when all assembly of the Bentley products was transferred to Crewe, England.

The Phaeton body was fabricated and painted at the Volkswagen works at Zwickau, Germany, and the completed bodies were transported approximately 100 km by special road transport vehicles to the main factory. Most Phaeton engines, the W12 being the notable exception, were built at the VW/Porsche/Audi engine plant in Győr, Hungary.

Reception and sales

Sales of the Phaeton fell far short of expectations. Its biggest market was China, followed by South Korea.

In 2002, the manufacturer stated the annual capacity of the new Phaeton plant at Dresden was 20,000; by September 2006 a four-year total of 25,000 had been built, with production running at approximately 6,000 cars annually. The domestic market was the Phaeton's strongest, with 19,314 Phaetons delivered in Germany alone by January 2009. Production decreased to 10,190 cars in 2012 and 5,812 in 2013. In Phaeton's production run that lasted 15 years, 84,253 units were built.

In Canada, 93 Phaetons were sold in 2004, and in the first eight months of 2005, only 21 found owners. In the United States market, 1,433 Phaetons were sold in 2004, and 820 were sold in 2005, leading the company to announce that sales in the North American market would end after the 2006 model year. The W12 engined models have depreciated significantly, and sell for a small fraction of their original cost.

The Phaeton debuted at prices comparable to similar offerings from Mercedes-Benz, BMW, Lexus and the Volkswagen Group's own Audi A8 (which shared its powertrain with the Phaeton). Motor Trend suggested that the "VW badge on the hood may not say 'premium' to many auto shoppers" but they were impressed at how the Phaeton drove.

In January 2011, Volkswagen reported the possibility of bringing the Phaeton back to the United States in the car's next product cycle. In Autumn 2013, The Economist placed Phaeton into the report on Europe's biggest loss making cars. In October 2014, Top Gear Magazine placed the Phaeton on its list of "The worst cars you can buy right now."

In 2008, Volkswagen released the first update to the Phaeton. Subtle design changes were made by the introduction of chrome fog light covers and cherry red rear lights. The CD-based navigation system was upgraded to a DVD system, and the 3.0 V6 TDI engine had its power increased from 222 to 230bhp.

The German Chancellor Gerhard Schröder chose Phaeton to be his official state car in his second term from 2002 to 2005. The reason is widely thought to be that before becoming chancellor, he previously served as the Minister-President of Lower Saxony in 1990–1998, where Volkswagen is headquartered in the city of Wolfsburg and is a major employer in the state, also Lower Saxony state government owns several shares in Volkswagen AG.

Third series (2008) (GP2)
The vehicle was unveiled in 2007 Geneva Motor Show.

Update included new LED daytime running lights, as well as a freshened centre console with revamped controls and materials. New Fuel Stratified Injection (FSI) V6 petrol engine with greater power and fuel efficiency (206 kW / 280 PS) which satisfy Euro-5 emissions standards is also available.

Other changes to the car for 2009 included: three new types of alloy wheels (17, 18 and 19 inch), a slightly modified radiator grille, three new exterior colours, the new leather colour, the new wood trims, white switch illumination instead of red, accent and switch trim in the new "Warm gray" colour, an upgraded car key, makeup mirror in the rear on the LWB version, dampers optimised for low-friction, Carbon fibre-reinforced Silicon Carbide (C/SiC) ceramic composite brakes (front) on the Phaeton W12, as well as a rearview camera (Rear Assist) and blind spot warning system Side Assist.

Fourth series (2011) (GP3)

The vehicle was unveiled in the 2010 Beijing International Automotive Exhibition.

The car for 2011 got a new front fascia to more closely resemble the Volkswagen styling direction first seen on the Golf Mk VI. This included new LED running lights, bi-xenon headlights and a new bumper with LED fog lights. The rear LED clusters were altered to mimic those found on facelifted Touran, Sharan, the new Touareg and the new Passat.

The interior benefited from some new technologies, but retained the 2009 MY layout. The Phaeton was offered in two wheelbase lengths (standard and long) and two seating layouts (standard five seats and optional four seats with full centre console). In the five-seat version, the front seats can be adjusted 12 ways. Standard features include all wheel drive, air suspension, and four zone automatic climate control. A multifunction steering wheel can be ordered in leather or wood leather.

The W12 engine option was deleted from the European and international markets except China where it was still offered until the end of Phaeton production in 2016.

Fifth series (2014) (GP4)
A further, minor facelift was introduced in 2014, including exterior alterations to the front fog lights and darkened rear lights. The interior was also updated including a new gear lever, gloss black accents around the gear lever and steering controls and the introduction of a new removable touch screen remote for rear passengers.

New technologies
Automatic Distance Control adaptive cruise control with new Stop&Go function
Front Assist collision avoidance system
Dynamic Light Assist non-glare highbeam
Traffic sign recognition that can also detect overtaking restrictions
GPS-Navigation with Google Earth
3G Mobile internet (UMTS)

Transmissions

Second generation
Before the Phaeton was discontinued in 2016, development of the second generation had already begun, with a near-production prototype already completed, which remained hidden until 2022.

Powertrain
, powertrain options for the Phaeton included the following engines. 4motion permanent four-wheel drive was the only driveline system available, except for the 2003 and 2004 model years when front wheel drive was available with the 3.2 litre engine.

The Phaeton features a Bosch ESP 5.7 Electronic Stability Programme, with Anti-Lock Braking System (ABS), Electronic Brakeforce Distribution (EBD), Anti-Slip Regulation (ASR) traction control system, Electronic Differential Lock (EDL), Engine Braking Control (EBC), with emergency Brake Assist (BA).

The electronic differential lock (EDL) employed by Volkswagen is not, as the name suggests, a differential lock at all. Sensors monitor wheel speeds across an individual driven axle, and if one wheel is rotating substantially faster than the other (i.e. slipping) the EDL system momentarily brakes it. This effectively transfers power to the other wheel.

Volkswagen was developing an electric version, but replaced it with their MEB2 platform for 2020.

See also 
 Volkswagen Phideon

References

External links

Cars introduced in 2002
2010s cars
Phaeton
All-wheel-drive vehicles
Flagship vehicles
Full-size vehicles
Luxury vehicles
Limousines
Sedans
Front-wheel-drive vehicles
Cars powered by VR engines